Pergolesi is a 1932 Italian historical musical film directed by Guido Brignone and starring Elio Steiner, Dria Paola and Tina Lattanzi. It portrays the brief life of the eighteenth century Italian composer Giovanni Battista Pergolesi.

It was shot at the Cines Studios in Rome. A separate French-language version Les amours de Pergolèse was released the following year.

Cast
 Elio Steiner as Giovanni Battista Pergolesi
 Dria Paola as Maria di Tor Delfina  
 Tina Lattanzi as Erminia  
 Livio Pavanelli as Nicola d'Arcangeli  
 Carlo Lombardi as Raniero di Tor Delfina  
 Mina D'Albore as La cantate  
 Lydia Simoneschi as La cameriera Nicoletta  
 Gemma Schirato as Didone  
 Romolo Costa as Ilario de Nerestra  
 Giacomo Almirante as Il maestro Lambrughi  
 Roberto Pasetti as Il notaio Verlupi  
 Giuseppe Pierozzi as Il critico teatrale  
 Cecyl Tryan as La modista  
 Vasco Creti 
 Olinto Cristina 
 Carlo Simoneschi 
 Franco Schirato 
 Amedeo Trilli
 Vincenzo Bettoni as Cantanto 
 Laura Pasini as Cantanta

References

Bibliography 
 Mitchell, Charles P. The Great Composers Portrayed on Film, 1913 through 2002. McFarland, 2004.

External links 
 

1930s historical musical films
Italian historical musical films
1930s biographical films
Italian biographical films
1932 films
1930s Italian-language films
Films directed by Guido Brignone
Films set in the 1730s
Films about classical music and musicians
Films about composers
Italian multilingual films
Cines Studios films
Italian black-and-white films
1932 multilingual films
Cultural depictions of Italian men
1930s Italian films